Moldova competed at the 2022 Winter Olympics in Beijing, China, from 4 to 20 February 2022.

On January 26, luger Doina Descalui was announced as the country's flagbearer during the opening ceremony. Meanwhile biathlete Alina Stremous was the flagbearer during the closing ceremony.

Competitors
The following is the list of number of competitors participating in the Moldovan delegation per sport.

Biathlon 

Based on individual results in the 2020–21 and 2020–21 Biathlon World Cup, Moldovan athletes ranked high enough to qualify 2 women and 2 men. Despite the eligibility, the Moldovan team did not enter the mixed relay competition.

Luge

Based on the results from the fall World Cups during the 2021–22 Luge World Cup season, Moldova earned the following start quotas:

References

Nations at the 2022 Winter Olympics
2022
2022 in Moldovan sport